The Free State of Bottleneck was a short-lived quasi-state that existed from 10 January 1919 until 25 February 1923. It was formed out of part of the Prussian province of Hesse-Nassau as a consequence of the occupation of the Rhineland following World War I. The Bottleneck is now part of the modern German states of Hesse and Rhineland-Palatinate.

Creation
Following the Armistice of 1918, Allied forces occupied the German territory west of the Rhine. To maintain a military presence on the eastern side, the Allied powers extended their zones of occupation by creating three semi-circular bridgeheads of  radius, radiating from Cologne (British zone), Koblenz (American zone), and Mainz (French zone).

The French and American zones did not meet entirely, leaving a narrow gap on the eastern side of the Rhine containing the Wisper valley, the towns of Lorch and Kaub, and villages of Lorchhausen, Sauerthal, Ransel, Wollmerschied, Welterod, Zorn, Strüth and Egenrod.

Surrounded by the two Allied bridgeheads, the Rhine to the south-west and no roads nor railways to speak of towards the north-east, this tiny region was effectively cut off from the rest of Germany and subsequently separated from the administration of the Weimar Republic.

Owing to the circular nature of the Allied bridgeheads, this enclosed territory took on the shape of a bottleneck, hence the name that was given to the microstate, when it was declared on 10 January 1919.

Life in the Bottleneck

The region contained approximately 17,000 people and its largest town, Lorch, was established as its capital. The mayor of Lorch, Edmund Pnischeck, was subsequently elected as president of this small territory. Pnischeck headed the Bottleneck's administration for the time of its existence, which even oversaw the production of its own stamps and currency.

There were no roads connecting the Bottleneck to unoccupied Germany, trains were not permitted to stop there, and air or river transportation was impossible. The movement of goods and post to and from the state was only made possible by smuggling. Once, a French train loaded with coal from the Ruhr valley was hijacked from neighbouring Rüdesheim am Rhein and taken to the Bottleneck, where the coal was distributed among the populace for heating purposes.

Foreign relations
The state issued its own passports to its citizens, and had plans to establish an embassy in Berlin. Furthermore, it was intended to establish diplomatic relations with other countries, but the state ceased to exist before these plans were realised.

Abolition
After four years of existence, the Free State of Bottleneck was abolished on 23 February 1923 following the French Occupation of the Ruhr. The Bottleneck was eventually reincorporated with the Prussian province of Hesse-Nassau.

The Bottleneck today
The territory that formerly comprised the Bottleneck is now part of the Rhine Gorge UNESCO World Heritage Site. The history of the Bottleneck is now a tourist attraction in the area, particularly in the former Free State's major towns of Kaub and Lorch.

Bottleneck stamps and currency are now sought-after rarities. Wine that was smuggled in from occupied Germany and stored in Lorch and Kaub can also fetch high prices.

See also
Free Republic of Schwarzenberg

References

External links 
Official website of the Free State of Bottleneck (German language)

1919 establishments in Germany
1923 disestablishments in Germany
Rheingau-Taunus-Kreis
Middle Rhine
Bottleneck
Bottleneck
Bottleneck
Bottleneck
Bottleneck
Bottleneck
Bottleneck
Bottleneck
Rheingau
Former republics